Chkalovsky District is the name of several districts in Russia. The districts are generally named for Valery Chkalov, a Soviet aircraft test pilot.

City divisions
Chkalovsky City District, Yekaterinburg, a city district of Yekaterinburg, the administrative center of Sverdlovsk Oblast

Historical districts
Chkalovsky District, Nizhny Novgorod Oblast (1936–2015), a former district of Nizhny Novgorod Oblast

See also
Chkalovsky (disambiguation)

References